Llŷr (; Lleddiaith meaning "half-speech" or "half-language") is a figure in Welsh mythology, probably originally a deity, probably derived from Irish Ler ("the Sea"), father of Manannán mac Lir. 
Other than his progeny and odd titbits, his identity remains obscure.

Llŷr appears as the father of Brân, Brânwen and Manawydan by Penarddun in the Branwen, Daughter of Llyr, the Second Branch of the Mabinogi.

The Welsh Triads states that Llŷr was imprisoned by Euroswydd, and presumably, Penarddun subsequently married Euroswydd, giving birth by Euroswydd to her two younger sons, Nisien and Efnisien, as stated in the Second Branch.

William Shakespeare's play King Lear is based on material taken secondhand (through Raphael Holinshed) from Geoffrey of Monmouth's mythical king King Leir, who has often been connected, but is likely unrelated, to Llŷr.

The House of Llŷr

(*) Unbordered names are figures not in Llŷr's line of descent, though perhaps members of the extended family. 
(*) This stemma is subject to further elaboration. If the Beli above is to be equated with Beli Mawr then Caswallawn stands as Penarddun's sibling. But Bromwich observes that Penarddun should be emended to being the sister of Beli, which would bring consistency with statement elsewhere that Caswallawn and Brân are cousins.

See also 
The House of Dôn

Notes

References
(Dictionaries)
, p. 301, under "Llŷr".

The New Companion to the Literature of Wales, Meic Stevens.
(Texts)

Gantz, Jeffrey (translator) (1987). The Mabinogion. New York: Penguin. .
Jones, Gwyn; Jones, Thomas (1993). The Mabinogion. London: Everyman. .

Mabinogion
Sea and river gods
Welsh gods
Welsh mythology
Mythological characters